Richard de St Liz (fl. 1328–1336) was an English politician.

He was a Member (MP) of the Parliament of England for Rutland in 1328, 1330, 1335 and 1336. He may have been related to another Rutland MP, William de St Liz, who represented the constituency in 1312.

References

Year of birth unknown
14th-century deaths
English MPs 1328
English MPs 1330
English MPs 1335–36